Air India Flight 855 was a scheduled passenger flight from Santa Cruz Airport, Bombay to Dubai International Airport, Dubai. All 213 passengers and crew on board were killed. An investigation into the crash determined the most likely probable cause was the captain becoming spatially disoriented after the failure of one of the flight instruments in the cockpit. It was Air India's deadliest aircraft crash until the bombing of Flight 182 in 1985. It was also the deadliest aviation accident in India until the Charkhi Dadri mid-air collision in 1996. , Flight 855 is still the second deadliest aircraft crash in both of these categories.

Aircraft and crew
The aircraft involved was a Boeing 747-237B, registration  named Emperor Ashoka. It was the first 747 delivered to Air India, in April 1971.

The flight crew consisted of the following persons:
 The captain was 51-year old Madan Lal Kukar. He had joined Air India in 1956, and was experienced, having almost 18,000 flight hours.
 The first officer was 43-year-old Indu Virmani, a former Indian Air Force commander who joined Air India in 1976. He had more than 4,500 flight hours.
 The flight engineer was 53-year-old Alfredo Faria, who joined Air India in 1955 and had 11,000 flight hours, making him one of Air India's most senior flight engineers at the time of the accident.

Sequence of events 
The aircraft departed from Bombay's Santa Cruz Airport (later Sahar Airport, now called Chhatrapati Shivaji Maharaj International Airport). The destination was Dubai International Airport in Dubai.

Approximately one minute after takeoff from runway 27, Captain Kukar made a scheduled right turn upon crossing the Bombay coastline over the Arabian Sea, after which the aircraft briefly returned to a normal level position. Soon it began rolling to the left, and never regained level flight.

The cockpit voice recorder recovered from the wreckage revealed that Captain Kukar was the first to notice a problem, when he said, "What's happened here, my instruments ..." The captain was explaining that his attitude indicator (AI) had "toppled", meaning that it was still showing the aircraft in a right bank. First Officer Virmani, whose presumably functional AI was now showing a left bank (and not noticing the captain's concern), said, "Mine has also toppled, looks fine." It is believed that the Captain mistakenly took this to mean that both primary AIs were indicating a right bank, in effect confirming what he believed he was seeing. It was after sunset and the aircraft was flying over a dark Arabian Sea, leaving the aircrew unable to visually cross-check their AI instrument readings with the actual horizon outside the cockpit windows.

The Boeing 747 had a third backup AI in the center instrument panel between the two pilots, and the transcripts of the cockpit conversation showed Flight Engineer Faria telling the captain, "Don't go by that one, don't go by that one..." trying to direct his attention towards that third AI, or perhaps to another instrument called the turn and bank indicator, just five seconds before the aircraft impacted the sea.

The captain's mistaken perception of the aircraft's attitude resulted in him using the aircraft flight control system to add more left bank and left rudder, causing the Boeing 747 to roll further left into a bank of 108 degrees and rapidly lose altitude. Just 101 seconds after leaving the runway, the jet hit the Arabian Sea at an estimated 35-degree nose-down angle. There were no survivors among the 190 passengers and 23 crew members.

Probable cause 
The partially recovered wreckage revealed no evidence of explosion, fire, or any electrical or mechanical failure; and an initial theory of sabotage was ruled out.

The investigation concluded that the probable cause was "due to the irrational control inputs by the captain following complete unawareness of the attitude as his AI had malfunctioned. The crew failed to gain control based on the other flight instruments."

US Federal District Judge James M. Fitzgerald, in a 139-page decision issued 1 November 1985, rejected charges of negligence against the Boeing Company,  Lear Siegler Inc, the manufacturer of the attitude   director indicator, and the Collins Radio division of Rockwell International, which manufactured the backup system in a suit related to the crash. Steven C. Marshall, the attorney for Boeing asserted that the crash had been caused by Captain Madan Kukar, who he said was "flying illegally under the influence of diabetic drugs, a condition compounded by his alcoholic intake and dieting in the 24 hours before the flight," and not due to equipment malfunctions. The suit was dismissed in 1986.

See also 

Sensory illusions in aviation
 List of aircraft accidents and incidents resulting in at least 50 fatalities

Notes

References

Further reading

External links 

 Design Induced Errors, which includes a discussion of the crash. (Archive)
Pre-crash photos of 747 VT-EBD at airliners.net

Airliner accidents and incidents caused by instrument failure
Airliner accidents and incidents caused by pilot error
Aviation accidents and incidents in India
Aviation accidents and incidents in 1978
Accidents and incidents involving the Boeing 747
855
1978 in India
History of Mumbai (1947–present)